
The following is a list of notable seawatching locations, by country:

Australia

New South Wales
 Magic Point

Queensland
 Point Lookout

Victoria
 Cape Schanck
 Point Addis
 Point Lonsdale

Western Australia
 North Mole, Fremantle
 Point Peron, Rockingham
 Woodman Point, Cockburn
 Hillarys Boat Harbour, Hillarys
 West end of Rottnest Island, Rottnest Island
 Halls Head, Mandurah
 Cape Naturaliste (near Dunsborough)
 Cape Leeuwin (near Augusta)
 Bunker Bay, Dunsborough
 Red Bluff, Kalbarri
 Red Bluff, Carnarvon

Britain

Cornwall
 Gwennap Head, Porthgwarra
 Pendeen Watch
 St Ives Island

Devon
 Prawle Point

Dorset
Portland Bill

County Durham
Hartlepool Headland

Kent
 Dungeness

Merseyside
Hilbre Island

Sussex
Selsey Bill

Tyne and Wear
Whitburn

Yorkshire
Flamborough Head

Wales
 Strumble Head
 Bardsey Island

Ireland

 Bridges of Ross. Co. Clare
 Loop Head. Co. Clare
 Kilcummin. Co. Mayo
 Downpatrick Head. Co. Mayo
 Mulloughmore Head. Co. Sligo
 St. Johns Point. Co. Donegal
 Galley Head. Co. Cork
 Cape Clear Island. Co. Cork
 Mizen Head. Co. Cork
 Dunowen. Co. Cork
 Brandon Head. Co. Kerry
 Helvic Head, Co. Waterford
 St. John's Point. Co. Down
 Clogher Head. Co. Louth
 Ramore Head. Co. Antrim

The Netherlands

Den Helder
IJmuiden
Katwijk
Lauwersoog
West Frisian Islands
Westkapelle

New Zealand

Kaikoura

Portugal

 Madeira

United States

California
Cordell Bank
Gulf of the Farallones
Monterey Bay

New Jersey
Avalon

North Carolina
Cape Hatteras

Texas
Hans and Pat Suter Wildlife Refuge, Corpus Christi, Texas

References

Birdwatching